Hisar Lok Sabha constituency (formerly Hissar) is one of the 10 Lok Sabha (parliamentary)  constituencies in Haryana state in Northern India. This constituency covers the entire Hisar district and parts of Jind and Bhiwani districts.

Voter composition
According to the election commission data reported by the Daily Pioneer in January 2019, the Jat-dominated Hisar Lok Sabha constituency has 15.76 lakh voters, including over 500,000 Jats (33%), over 70,000 Prajapati/Kumhar (5%), over 180,000 Brahmins (15%), 65,000 Punjabis (4%), over 36,000 Bishnois (2.2%), and the rest 400,000 23%) are of various Scheduled Castes and Backward Classes.

Assembly segments
At present, Hisar Lok Sabha constituency comprises nine Vidhan Sabha (legislative assembly) constituencies. These are:

Members of Parliament

^ by poll

Election Results

See also

 Hisar (city)
 Hisar Urban Agglomeration
 Hisar district
 Hisar division
 Hisar (Vidhan Sabha constituency)
 Asigarh Fort at Hansi
 Kanwari Indus Valley Mound at Kanwari 
 Tosham rock inscription at Tosham 
 List of Indus Valley Civilization sites
 List of Monuments of National Importance in Haryana
 List of State Protected Monuments in Haryana
 List of National Parks & Wildlife Sanctuaries of Haryana, India
 Haryana Tourism

References

Lok Sabha constituencies in Haryana
Hisar district